Capnopsis schilleri is a species of insect belonging to the family Capniidae.

It is native to Europe.

References

Plecoptera